The Nezatash Pass or Neza-Tash Pass (Aghbai Nayzatosh) is a mountain pass in the Sarikol Range between Gorno-Badakhshan Autonomous Province in Tajikistan and Tashkurgan Tajik Autonomous County in Xinjiang, China. The name of the path means "spear stone" in Kyrgyz as it is named after a rock near the location.

History 

Neztash Pass is a minor path on the Silk Road. During ancient times, it was not a main Silk Road route due to the fact that it took traveler far from settlements, lacked sources of water, and had a relatively higher elevation.

However, during the 19th century, Neztash Pass was frequently used by European explorers passing through the region.

That path sits on the border between China and Tajikistan in the historic region of Badakhshan. In the 1890s, the Chinese, Russian, and Afghan governments signed a series of agreements that divided Badakhshan, but China contested the result of the division. The dispute was eventually settled in 2002 when Tajikistan and China signed a border agreement.

See also
 China–Tajikistan border
 Kulma_Pass
 Beyik Pass
 Tegermansu Pass 
 Wakhjir Pass 
 Chalachigu Valley 
 Afghanistan–China border

References 

Mountain passes of China
Mountain passes of Tajikistan
Mountain passes of Xinjiang
China–Tajikistan border
Mountain passes of the Pamir
Sites along the Silk Road
Tashkurgan Tajik Autonomous County